The Academy of Medicine of Malaysia is a professional and educational society for doctors in Malaysia. Founded in 1966, the Academy is based in Kuala Lumpur and includes all medical specialities. The Academy's motto is "terus maju" (English: progress ahead/continue to advance).

Background
The Academy of Medicine, Singapore, was founded in 1957 and served both Singapore and Malaysia. The State of Singapore merged with the Federation of Malaya in 1963, but the union ended in 1965. Following the separation of the 2 countries, the independent Academy of Medicine of Malaysia was founded in 1966. The Academy was officially established by the Societies Act (1966) on 22 December 1966. The Academy's mandate includes all medical specialties.

Membership
Membership is available to certified specialists who have obtained higher professional qualifications. Members and Fellows are entitled to use the letters AM and FAMM after their names.

Notable honorary members include:
 Mohamed Suffian Mohamed Hashim, former Chief Justice of Malaya and former Lord President of the Federal Court of Malaysia
 Raymond Hoffenberg, former President of the Royal College of Physicians
 Abdul Razak Hussein, former Prime Minister of Malaysia
 Mahathir Mohamad, former Prime Minister of Malaysia
 Ismail Abdul Rahman, former Deputy Prime Minister of Malaysia
 Tunku Abdul Rahman, first Prime Minister of Malaysia
 Michael Rosen, former President of the Royal College of Anaesthetists
 Tan Siew Sin, Malaysia's first Minister of Commerce and Industry and later Finance Minister
 Ian Todd, former President of the Royal College of Surgeons of England,

Constituent colleges
 College of Anaesthesiologists
 College of Dental Specialists
 College of Emergency Physicians
 College of Obstetricians and Gynaecologists
 College of Paediatrics
 College of Pathologists
 College of Physicians
 College of Public Health Medicine
 College of Radiology
 College of Surgeons
 College of Ophthalmologist

References

Organizations established in 1966
Medical and health organisations based in Malaysia
Professional associations based in Malaysia
1966 establishments in Malaysia